Orthogonius xanthomerus is a species of ground beetle in the subfamily Orthogoniinae. It was described by L. Redtenbacher in 1867.

References

xanthomerus
Beetles described in 1867